Zoe Rahman (born 20 January 1971) is an English jazz composer and pianist.

Early life
Rahman was born and brought up in Chichester, West Sussex, England by a Bengali father, Mizan Rahman, and an English-Irish mother. Her mother was a doctor who grew up in New Zealand. Rahman describes her childhood as being "completely English" and has described herself as culturally "very English". Her father's family is from Dhaka. Her maternal grandmother is from Ireland.

Rahman started off playing classical piano when she was about four years old. Her family had a piano that her parents had bought for £10 and Rahman's older sister started to play; her other two siblings and Rahman followed her footsteps. Rahman and her younger brother, Idris, got into listening to jazz when they were teenagers and tried to work out how to play. Rahman had jazz piano lessons with various teachers and found opportunities to gig with other musicians.

She studied classical piano at the Royal Academy of Music, received a music degree at St Hugh's College, University of Oxford, and won a scholarship to study jazz performance at Berklee College of Music in Boston, where she had lessons with pianist Joanne Brackeen. While in America she formed her own trio, which featured bassist Joshua Davis and drummer Bob Moses.

In 2002, Rahman discovered Bengali music, when her father was hospitalised and she had transferred some of his cassette tapes of 1950s Bengali music to CDs for him to listen to while he recuperated. Rahman became intrigued by the sounds and subsequent trips to Bangladesh allowed Rahman to learn about her background through music.

Later life and career

Radio and television appearances
Rahman has been the featured artist on radio and television programmes such as Courtney Pine's Jazz Crusade on BBC Radio 2, BBC Radio 4's Woman's Hour, BBC London's Now's the Time, Andrea Oliver's The Selector, Northern Broadcasting Internet Radio, Resonance FM and Julian Joseph's Jazz series for Meridian Television. She has performed live on the BBC World Service and on BBC Radio 3's In Tune.

Recording and performances
In 2001, her debut album The Cynic was released. In July 2006, her second album Melting Pot was released. Melting Pot was nominated for the Mercury Music Prize Album of the Year and won Jazz Album of the Year at the Parliamentary Jazz Awards in 2006. In September 2008, her third album Where Rivers Meet was released. In May 2009, her fourth album Zoe Rahman Trio: Live was released. In January 2012, her fifth album Kindred Spirits was released. Kindred Spirits won the Best Jazz Act award at the 2012 MOBO Awards.

Rahman was sought out by music producer Paul Vlcek to play with George Mraz. In July 2013, their album Unison was released. Rahman's first solo piano album, Dreamland, was recorded in 2015 and released by Manushi.

Aside from working with her own groups, Rahman continues to perform and record (both in the UK and internationally) with a diverse range of other artists. These have included: Courtney Pine; Clark Tracey's New Quintet; Soothsayers; Jerry Dammers' Spatial AKA Orchestra; Keziah Jones (2003/2004 European tours); David Walcott (2003 Festival, Barbados); Mekaal Hasan (2001 tour, Pakistan). She co-wrote a jazz-based theatre show, I'm a Fool to Want You, about the French writer/musician Boris Vian, with Told by an Idiot Theatre Company (UK / South American tours 2003–2005).

Other albums or DVDs that she has appeared on include: Courtney Pine's Song (The Ballad Book) and Europa; Reem Kelani's Sprinting Gazelle; the Clark Tracey Quintet's The Calling and The Mighty Sa; Tony Bianco's In a Western Sense; Gary Boyle's Games; Soothsayers' Tangled Roots; Brigitte Escobar's Brigitte; Terry Hall/Mushtaq's The Hour of Two Lights; Cevanne Horrocks-Hopayian's Big Ears; and Keziah Jones's Live at the Élysée Montmartre DVD.

Composer

Rahman composed the piano score for the 2020 touring production of The Strange Tale of Charlie Chaplin and Stan Laurel.

Tours
Rahman has toured extensively throughout the UK and internationally, including North Sea Jazz Festival, Molde Jazz Festival, Palermo Jazz Festival, Algeria's European Cultural Festival, Cork Jazz Festival, Estonia's Nargen Festival, Barbados Jazz Festival and Rochester International Jazz Festival.

From 2009 to 2012, Rahman toured with Jerry Dammers' The Spatial AKA Orchestra, bringing Sun Ra to a new audience. She also worked with bands led by bassist Danny Thompson, exploring the legacy of songwriter Nick Drake; singer Martha Wainwright; and saxophonist Courtney Pine.

Personal life
Rahman has a son, who was born in 2014.

Reception
Rahman has been described in The Observer as "one of the finest young pianists in Europe" and "a remarkable pianist by any standard".

Awards and nominations

Discography
An asterisk (*) indicates that the year is that of release.

As leader/co-leader

See also
British Bangladeshi
List of British Bangladeshis

References

Further reading
Griffiths, James (22 February 2005) Review of Zoe Rahman Trio. The Guardian. 
Lusk, John (19 September 2008) Zoe & Idris Rahman Where Rivers Meet Review. BBC Music.

External links

Zoe Rahman on BritBangla

1971 births
Living people
English people of Bangladeshi descent
English people of Irish descent
English jazz pianists
English women pianists
Women jazz pianists
People from Chichester
Berklee College of Music alumni
Alumni of St Hugh's College, Oxford
21st-century English women musicians
21st-century pianists
21st-century women pianists